Frank Kretschmer is a former East German slalom canoeist who competed in the mid-to-late 1970s. He won a bronze medal in the C-2 event at the 1977 ICF Canoe Slalom World Championships in Spittal.

References

German male canoeists
Living people
Year of birth missing (living people)
Medalists at the ICF Canoe Slalom World Championships